Hana (also Romanized as Ḩanā and Henā’; also known as Qal‘eh-i-Hina) is a village in Jolgah Rural District, in the Central District of Jahrom County, Fars Province, Iran. At the 2006 census, its population was 560, in 123 families.

References 

Populated places in Jahrom County